Meathead may refer to:

Matt Mitrione, an American mixed martial artist, and former NFL football player
Michael Stivic, a character on the American sitcom All in the Family
Meathead (Tom and Jerry), a grayish brown alley cat who first appeared in the 1943 Tom and Jerry short Sufferin' Cats! and several shorts in both the classic and modern era
Meathead (band), an Italian rock band
 "Meathead" Louis Green
Meatheads Burgers & Fries, a restaurant with ten locations in Illinois
an extraterrestrial character in the film Meatballs Part II
a person addicted to the illegal substance "meat" in The 80s: A Look Back at the Tumultuous Decade 1980–1989